Komenda/Edina/Eguafo/Abirem Municipal District is one of the twenty-two districts in Central Region, Ghana. Originally created as an ordinary district assembly in 1988 when it was known as Komenda/Edina/Eguafo/Abirem District, which was created from the Cape Coast Municipal Council; until it was later elevated to municipal district assembly status on 29 February 2008 to become Komenda/Edina/Eguafo/Abirem Municipal District. The municipality is located in the southwest part of Central Region and has Elmina as its capital town.

List of settlements

Sources
 
 District: Komenda/Edina/Eguafo/Abirem Municipal District

References

Central Region (Ghana)

Districts of the Central Region (Ghana)